San Ponziano may refer to:

San Ponziano, Lucca, church
San Ponziano, Rome, church
San Ponziano, Spoleto, monastery
Pope Pontian, Christian saint